Jean Cipollina (1903–1981) was an Italian rower. He competed at the 1924 Summer Olympics in Paris with the men's coxed four where they came fourth.

References

1903 births
Year of death unknown
Italian male rowers
Olympic rowers of Italy
Rowers at the 1924 Summer Olympics
Sportspeople from Genoa
European Rowing Championships medalists